Grablovirus is a genus of plant viruses in the family Geminiviridae. The genus has three species.

Taxonomy
The following species are recognized:
Grapevine red blotch virus
Prunus latent virus
Wild Vitis latent virus

References

Geminiviridae
Virus genera